Cal Falcons is a website and social media community featuring three live streaming webcams trained on a peregrine falcon nest site atop Sather Tower at the University of California, Berkeley. Cal Falcons is known for its extensive social media presence and following. The live stream runs continuously throughout the year, recording all facets of the falcon lifecycle, including courtship, breeding, and raising young. The site launched with two cameras in January 2019.

Nest site

Peregrine falcons initially established a territory and nest at Sather Tower in spring of 2017. Initially, the falcon pair laid their eggs on a broken sandbag on the upper balcony of Sather Tower, which was replaced by researchers with a nest box after scientists found that eggs were rolling off of the sandbag. In the wild, falcons nest on rocky ledges and cliff faces, so the gravel-filled nest box was designed to mimic those conditions. A permanent wooden nest box was installed in 2018, prior to the pair's second breeding season. Two cameras were installed prior to the 2019 nesting season, allowing continual remote viewing of the nest area.

Breeding pair  
The breeding pair that established the territory in 2017 were named Annie and Grinnell as part of a crowdfunding campaign to purchase the cameras. Annie, the female, was named after Annie Montague Alexander, a naturalist who founded the University of California Museum of Paleontology and Museum of Vertebrate Zoology. Grinnell, the male, was named after Joseph Grinnell, the first director of the Museum of Vertebrate Zoology.

On October 31, 2021, Grinnell was injured in a territorial battle with another falcon. He was taken to the Lindsay Wildlife Experience for evaluation and rehabilitation. Grinnell was diagnosed with several injuries, including puncture wounds, a wing injury, and a damaged beak. During the period Grinnell was in the hospital, an unknown male began to court Annie. Grinnell was released from care on November 17, 2021 and subsequently reclaimed the territory from the unknown male. During the 2022 breeding season, Annie disappeared for a week prior to laying eggs, leading to speculation that she had been injured, killed, or driven away from the territory, as multiple unknown female birds were seen courting Grinnell. After her return, Annie laid two eggs with Grinnell. On March 31, 2022, Grinnell was found dead in the road in downtown Berkeley. Cause of death was not known, but he may have been hit by a car after being attacked by a rival falcon. On April 1, 2022, Annie was courted by a new male who quickly established a pair bond with her, leading to a third egg being laid and the entire clutch being incubated by both Annie and the new male. Following a public vote, the new male was named Alden, after Alden Miller, a UC Berkeley ornithologist who succeeded Joseph Grinnell as director of the Museum of Vertebrate Zoology.

Nesting history 

Between 2017 and 2021, Annie and Grinnell raised a total of thirteen chicks, twelve of which successfully fledged. One, named Lux, died shortly after leaving the nest site by hitting a window. Prior to Grinnell's death in 2022 Annie also laid two more eggs assumed to be fathered by Grinnell. As of April 2022 Annie has also laid an additional egg of unknown parentage. Each year Cal Falcons holds an naming contest for the season's chicks largely via social media. Previous names have included Berkeley's motto (Fiat/Lux), chemical elements discovered at UC Berkeley, conservationists critical to the peregrine falcon's recovery, native plants of Berkeley, falcon figures in Native American tradition, and famous scientists. Two of the chicks fledged from UC Berkeley, a female named Lawrencium (aka Larry) and a male named Sequoia have are known to have established territories in the San Francisco Bay Area. Lawrencium has successfully raised several broods of chicks on Alcatraz island.

References

External links
Website

Birdwatching sites in the United States
Ornithological equipment and methods